Bohol is a town in Xudun District in the Sool region of Somaliland. It is located northwest by road from Xudun and is the second largest town in Xudun District.

Overview
Bohol is located between 2 towns which are Dararweyne and Xudun.

Demographics
The small town of Bohol and the surrounding areas such as Ceel La Helay, Sabawanaag, God Gheere, Docolaha has a total population of 346 residents. 
 
The town is primarily inhabited by people from the Somali ethnic group, with the Sa'ad Yoonis sub-division of the Habaryonis sub-clan of the Garhajis Isaaq well-represented.

See also
Administrative divisions of Somaliland
Regions of Somaliland
Districts of Somaliland
Somalia–Somaliland border

References

External links
Maplandia World Gazetteer
Bohol, Somalia

Populated places in Sool, Somaliland